Abdi Mohamoud Omar or Abdi Ilay is an Ethiopian politician who was the president of the  Somali Region of Ethiopia from 2010 to 2018. He served as in the Somali regional parliament and was a member of the ruling Ethiopian Somali People Democratic Party (ESPDP), as well as a number five of the Meles Zenawi Foundation. However, he was removed from his positions and arrested a few months after Abiy Ahmed assumed office.

Career

Abdi Omar’s name appeared on the electoral list during the 2005 Ethiopian election, when the Somali tribes in  Somali Region were loggerheaded for sharing electoral seats. Beyond his military links, Godfather and his special adviser is Abdi Ciro, who was a Somali colonel of the national security services (known as NSS), behind his promoting into the tribal electoral contests.

Becoming a member of the parliament did not come easy to Abdi, because he originated in a small sub-clan of Abdille, the major clan of the Ogaden. Those had no district with the Korahe region. His candidates caused a lot of controversial talk, with the interference of indisputable Ethiopian military commanders resulted to register him to be a parliament member acting of the Korahe region.

Under the 10 year rule of Abdi Mohamoud Omar, the region development in every aspect never seen before, despite the human atrocities that took place under his administration.

Resignation and criminal charges
On 6 August 2018, Abdi Mohamoud Omar resigned as President of the Somali Region amid violence in the regional capital, Jigjiga. He was replaced as president by Mustafa Muhummed Omer. On 27 August, it was reported that Abdi had been arrested by federal forces and charged with crimes.

On 30 January 2019, Abdi was additionally charged with attempting to incite violence and "overthrow the constitutional order". On 6 February, he pleaded not guilty to the charges.

References

External links
Ethiomedia, the regional administration chief (President) led by Abdi Mohamud Omar is convincing the Federal government 

Somalian people of Ethiopian descent
Living people
Year of birth missing (living people)